Arena was once a hamlet in the southwestern part of the province of Saskatchewan, Canada.

See also 

 List of ghost towns in Canada
 Ghost towns in Saskatchewan

Footnotes

Frontier No. 19, Saskatchewan
Populated places established in 1910
Ghost towns in Saskatchewan
Division No. 4, Saskatchewan

nl:Arena